The 1967–68 season is Real Madrid Club de Fútbol's 65th season in existence and the club's 36th consecutive season in the top flight of Spanish football.

Summary 
The club won its 13th League title ever and second in a row after recovered the number one spot from Atlético Madrid on round 16, the team clinched the trophy three points above runners-up CF Barcelona. In the Copa del Generalísimo, the team reached the Final with a chance to secure the domestic double. There, Real faced Barcelona, losing 0–1 after an early Zunzunegui own goal. After the end of the season, President Santiago Bernabéu gave the Laureada trophy to Pirri due to his outstanding playing in favor of Real Madrid, being only one of two players in club history to receive it.

Meanwhile, in the European Cup the team suffered to win the preliminary round series against Ajax with young star playmaker Johan Cruijff, the Dutch squad was finally defeated after extra time in Madrid. Then, the squad clinched the round of 16, and quarterfinals against Sparta Praha reaching the semi-finals where it was defeated by young star forward George Best and his Manchester United, losing the away match of the series (0–1 at Old Trafford). In the second leg at Madrid, the squad took a 3–1 advantage score in the first half, however, in the second half Manchester United managed to score two goals and getting the draw to reach the Final. The English squad included in its line up players such as: Dennis Law (under surgery just before the Final), 1966 FIFA World Cup Champion Bobby Charlton and Nobby Stiles.

Goalkeeper Andres Junquera won the Zamora Trophy with the better average of goals conceded. After 9 years, two times European Cup winner defender Pachin left the club.

Squad

Transfers

Competitions

La Liga

Position by round

League table

Matches

Copa del Generalísimo

Round of 32

Eightfinals

Quarter-finals

Semifinals

Final

European Cup

Preliminary round

Eightfinals

Quarter-finals

Semi-finals

Statistics

Players statistics

See also 
 Yé-yé (Real Madrid)

References

External links 
 BDFútbol

Real Madrid CF seasons
Spanish football championship-winning seasons
Real Madrid